Nasir Ahmed (born 7 November 1984) is a Pakistani field hockey player. He competed in the 2008 Summer Olympics.

References

External links
 

1984 births
Living people
Field hockey players at the 2008 Summer Olympics
Pakistani male field hockey players
Olympic field hockey players of Pakistan
Field hockey players from Karachi
Field hockey players at the 2006 Asian Games
Asian Games medalists in field hockey
Asian Games bronze medalists for Pakistan
Medalists at the 2006 Asian Games
Commonwealth Games medallists in field hockey
Commonwealth Games silver medallists for Pakistan
Field hockey players at the 2006 Commonwealth Games
2010 Men's Hockey World Cup players
21st-century Pakistani people
Medallists at the 2006 Commonwealth Games